List of aircraft operators that are licensed by the Thai civil aviation authorities.

Scheduled airlines

Charter airlines

Cargo airlines

See also
 List of airlines
 List of defunct airlines of Thailand
 List of airports in Thailand
 Busiest airports in Thailand
 List of defunct airlines of Asia

Thailand
Airlines
Airlines
Thailand